The 1930 Ohio State Buckeyes football team represented Ohio State University as a member the Big Ten Conference during the 1930 college football season. Led by second-year head coach Sam Willaman, the Buckeyes compiled an overall record of 5–2–1, with a mark of 2–2–1 in conference play, placing fifth.

Schedule

References

Ohio State
Ohio State Buckeyes football seasons
Ohio State Buckeyes football